Donald Dunstan may refer to:
Don Dunstan (1926–1999), Premier of South Australia
Donald Dunstan (governor) (1923–2011), senior Army Officer and Governor of South Australia